Human Rights Award(s) may refer to:

Human Rights Award (Sarajevo Film Festival) (from 2004), an award given at the Sarajevo Film Festival, for a documentary film dealing with human rights
Human Rights Award of Korea (from 2005),  the highest human rights award of the Republic of Korea
Human Rights Awards (Australia) (from 1987), a series of Australian human rights awards